Jelen, Bemoim, or Jeléen, was a buumi—a king or prince of the Jolof Empire.

Scholar Kate Lowe describes Jelen as "a Wolof from Senegambia and a member of the wider royal family". Jelen's kingdom was near the mouth of the Senegal River. The Portuguese name "Bemoim", according to Michael Ralph and Peter Russell, likely comes from the Wolof word "bumi", which means "heir".

Portuguese accounts of Jelen begin when merchants said he did not pay for items he had bought from them. Bemoim received an envoy from Portugal sent to address the dispute. No money changed hands, but Jelen gave the Portuguese monarch 100 slaves.

In 1487, Jelen asked the Portuguese for help in a military campaign against his rivals. According to Peter Russell, civil wars were frequent among Wolof nobility at that time. The Portuguese refused to help Jelen. Jelen eventually had to withdraw to Arguin, a Portuguese colonial garrison. From Arguin, he went to Portugal and had an audience with John II of Portugal, likely in September or October 1488. He was treated as a visiting European monarch would have been.

Jelen was baptized during the visit, on 3 November 1488, and given the baptismal name João. Before his baptism, Jelen was Muslim. Peter Russell argues that John II had in fact been trying to get Jelen to convert for a while, perhaps because John was interested in spreading Christianity in the area known to the Portuguese as Guinea.

Jelen was murdered on the way back to West Africa by Pero Vaz da Cunha, who alleged Jelen had committed treason.

Notes

Sources

Further reading 
 
 

History of West Africa
Portuguese colonisation in Africa